A British passport is a travel document issued by the United Kingdom or other British dependencies and territories to individuals holding any form of British nationality. It grants the bearer international passage in accordance with visa requirements and serves as proof of citizenship. It also facilitates access to consular assistance from British embassies around the world. Passports are issued using royal prerogative, which is exercised by His Majesty's Government; this means that the grant of a passport is a privilege, not a right, and may be withdrawn in some circumstances. British citizen passports have been issued in the UK by His Majesty's Passport Office, an agency of the Home Office, since 2014.  All passports issued in the UK since 2006 have been biometric.

The legacy of the United Kingdom as an imperial power has resulted in several types of British nationality, and different types of British passport exist as a result. Furthermore, each of the Crown dependencies and Overseas territories issue their own variants of British passports to those with links to their jurisdictions, which have small differences from the UK-variant passport. All British passports enable the bearer to request consular assistance from British embassies and from certain Commonwealth embassies in some cases. British citizens can use their passport as evidence of right of abode in the United Kingdom.

Between 1920 and 1992, the standard design of British passports was a navy blue hardcover booklet featuring the royal coat of arms emblazoned in gold. From 1988, the UK adopted machine readable passports in accordance with the International Civil Aviation Organization standard 9303. At this time, the passport colour was also changed to burgundy red, to bring it into line with the European Community passports of the other member states. The previous blue hardback passport continued to be issued in tandem with the new design until stocks were exhausted in 1992. March 2020 saw the introduction of a new navy blue passport with a continuity design based on the previous blue passport last issued in 1992. This design was phased in over a number of months, and when introduced, the plan was that all passports issued should be blue by mid-2020. All passports are now issued with the blue design and they are made by Thales DIS (formerly Gemalto) in Poland.

British citizens have visa-free or visa on arrival access to 188 countries and territories; the international access available to British citizens ranks sixth in the world according to the 2023 Visa Restrictions Index.
Since the introduction of biometric passports in 2006, a new design has been introduced every five years.

History

Early passports (1414–1921)

King Henry V of England is credited with having invented what some consider the first passport in the modern sense, as a means of helping his subjects prove who they were in foreign lands. The earliest reference to these documents is found in the Safe Conducts Act 1414. In 1540, granting travel documents in England became a role of the Privy Council of England, and it was around this time that the term "passport" was introduced. In Scotland, passports were issued by the Scottish Crown and could also be issued on the Crown's behalf by burghs, senior churchmen and noblemen. Passports were still signed by the monarch until 1685, when the Secretary of State could sign them instead. The Secretary of State signed all passports in place of the monarch from 1794 onwards, at which time formal records started to be kept; all of these records still exist.  Passports were written in Latin or English until 1772, then in French until 1858.  Since that time, they have been written in English, with some sections translated into French. In 1855, passports became a standardised document issued solely to British nationals. They were a simple single-sheet hand-drafted paper document.

Some duplicate passports and passport records are available at the British Library; for example IOR: L/P&J/11 contain a few surviving passports of travelling ayahs from the 1930s.
A passport issued on 18 June 1641 and signed by King Charles I still exists.

Starting in the late 19th century, an increasing number of Britons began travelling abroad due to the advent of railways and travel services such as the Thomas Cook Continental Timetable. The speed of trains, as well as the number of passengers that crossed multiple borders, made enforcement of passport laws difficult, and many travellers did not carry a passport in this era. However, the outbreak of World War I led to the introduction of modern border controls, including in the UK with passage of the British Nationality and Status of Aliens Act 1914. Thus, in 1915 the British government developed a new format of passport that could be mass-produced and used to quickly identify the bearer. The new passport consisted of a printed sheet folded into ten and affixed to a clothed cardboard cover. It included a description of the holder as well as a photograph, and had to be renewed after two years.

Passport booklets (1921–1993)

In October 1920, the League of Nations held the Paris Conference on Passports & Customs Formalities and Through Tickets. British diplomats joined with 42 countries to draft passport guidelines and a general booklet design resulted from the conference. The League model specified a 32-page booklet of 15.5 cm by 10.5 cm (6.1 inches by 4.1 inches). The first four pages were reserved for detailing the bearer's physical characteristics, occupation and residence.

The British government formed the Passport Office in the same year and in 1921 began issuing 32-page passports with a navy blue hardcover with an embossed coat of arms. "BRITISH PASSPORT" was the common identifier printed at the top of all booklets, while the name of the issuing government was printed below the coat of arms (e.g. United Kingdom, New Zealand, Hong Kong). Cut-outs in the cover allowed the bearer's name and the passport number to be displayed. This format would remain the standard for most British passports until the introduction of machine-readable passports in 1988. It continued to be issued in the United Kingdom until the end of 1993.

As with many contemporary travel documents worldwide, details were handwritten into the passport and (as of 1955) included: number, holder's name, "accompanied by his wife" and her maiden name, "and" (number) "children", national status. For both bearer and wife: profession, place and date of birth, country of residence, height, eye and hair colour, special peculiarities, signature and photograph. Names, birth dates, and sexes of children, list of countries for which valid, issue place and date, expiry date, a page for renewals and, at the back, details of the amount of foreign exchange for travel expenses (a limited amount of sterling, typically £50 but increasing with inflation, could be taken out of the country). The bearer's sex was not explicitly stated, although the name was written in with title ("Mr John Smith"). Descriptive text was printed in both English and French (a practice which  continues), e.g., "Accompanied by his wife (Maiden name)/Accompagné de sa femme (Née)". Changed details were struck out and rewritten, with a rubber-stamped note confirming the change.

If details and photograph of a man's wife and details of children were entered (this was not compulsory), the passport could be used by the bearer, wife, and children under 16, if together; separate passports were required for the wife or children to travel independently. The passport was valid for five years, renewable for another five, after which it had to be replaced.

Renewal of a passport required physical cancellation of the old passport, which was then returned to the bearer.  The top-right corner of its front cover was cut off and "Cancelled" was stamped into one or both of the cut-outs in the front cover, which showed the passport number and the bearer's name, as well on the pages showing the bearer's details and the document's validity.

For much of the 20th century, the passport had a printed list of countries for which it was valid, which was added to manually as validity increased. A passport issued in 1955 was valid for the British Commonwealth, USA, and all countries in Europe "including the USSR, Turkey, Algeria, Azores, Canary Islands, Iceland, and Madeira"; during its period of validity restrictions eased and it was endorsed "and for all other foreign countries".

The British visitor's passport
A new simplified type, the British Visitor's Passport, was introduced in 1961.  It was a single sheet of cardboard, folded in three so as to consist of six pages the same size as those of a regular passport, and was valid for one year.  It was obtainable for many years from Employment Exchanges, as agents of the Passport Office, and later from a Post Office. It was accepted for travel by most west European countries (excluding surface travel to West Berlin), but was dropped in 1995 since it did not meet new security standards.  A cancelled passport, which was returned to the bearer, had its top-right corner cut off, which had the effect of removing a corner from every page.

Machine-readable passports (1988–2006)

After the passport standardisation efforts of the 1920s, further effort to update international passport guidance was limited. The United Kingdom joined the European Communities in 1973, at a time when the Communities was looking to strengthen European civic identity. Between 1974 and 1975, the member states developed a common format. Member states agreed that passports should be burgundy in colour and feature the heading "European Community" in addition to the country name. Adoption was by member states was voluntary. While most of the Community adopted the format by 1985, the UK continued to issue the traditional blue booklet.

Rapid growth of air travel and technological change led to the International Civil Aviation Organization defining a new international standard for machine-readable passports, ICAO Doc 9303, in 1980. An ICAO standard machine-readable passport was a significant departure from the traditional British passport layout, and the British government did not immediately adopt it. In 1986, the United States announced the US Visa Waiver Program. The concept allowed for passport holders of certain countries to enter the US for business or tourism without applying for a visitor visa. The UK was the first country to join the scheme in 1988; however, a requirement was that the traveller hold a machine-readable passport. Thus, the British government was, after nearly 70 years, forced to retire the traditional navy blue League of Nations format passport.

With the move to machine-readable passports, the UK decided to adopt the European Community format. On 15 August 1988, the Glasgow passport office became the first to issue burgundy-coloured machine-readable passports. They had the words 'European Community' on the cover, later changed to 'European Union' in 1997. The passport had 32 pages; while a 48-page version was made available with more space for stamps and visas. Two lines of machine-readable text were printed in ICAO format, and a section was included in which relevant terms ("surname", "date of issue", etc.) were translated into the official EU languages. Passports issued overseas did not all have a Machine Readable Zone, but these were introduced gradually as appropriate equipment was made available overseas.

While other British territories such as Hong Kong and the Cayman Islands were not part of the European Community, they also adopted the same European format, although "British Passport" remained at the top rather than "European Community".

In 1998 the first digital image passport was introduced with photographs being replaced with images printed directly on the data page which was moved from the cover to an inside page to reduce the ease of fraud. These documents were all issued with machine-readable zones and had a hologram over the photograph, which was the first time that British passports had been protected by an optically variable safeguard. These documents were issued until 2006 when the biometric passport was introduced.

Biometric passports (2006–present)

Series A (2006–2015)
In the late 1990s, ICAO's Technical Advisory Group began developing a new standard for storing biometric data (e.g. photo, fingerprints, iris scan) on a chip embedded in a passport. The September 11 attacks involving the hijacking of commercial airliners led to the rapid incorporation of the group's technical report in to ICAO Doc 9303.

The Identity and Passport Service issued the first biometric British passport on 6 February 2006, known as Series A. This was the first British passport to feature artwork. Series A, version 1 was produced between 2006 and 2010, while an updated version 2 with technical changes and refreshed artwork was produced between 2010 and 2015.

Version 1 showcased birds native to the British Isles. The bio-data page was printed with a finely detailed background including a drawing of a red grouse, and the entire page was protected from modification by a laminate which incorporates a holographic image of the kingfisher; visa pages were numbered and printed with detailed backgrounds including drawings of other birds: a merlin, curlew, pied avocet, and red kite. An RFID chip and antenna were visible on the official observations page and held the same visual information as printed, including a digital copy of the photograph with biometric information for use with facial recognition systems. The Welsh and Scottish Gaelic languages were included in all British passports for the first time, and appeared on the titles page replacing the official languages of the EU, although the EU languages still appeared faintly as part of the background design. Welsh and Scottish Gaelic preceded the official EU languages in the translations section.

In 2010, Her Majesty's Passport Office signed a ten-year, £400 million contract with De La Rue to produce British passports. This resulted in Series A, version 2, which introduced minor security enhancements. The biometric chip was relocated from the official observations page to inside the cover, and the observations page itself was moved from the back of the passport to immediately after the data page. All new art was produced for version 2, this time with a coastal theme. Data and visa pages featured coastal scenes, wildlife and meteorological symbols.

Renewal of the passport required physical cancellation of the old passport, which was then returned to the bearer.  The top-right corners of its front and back covers were cut off, as well as the top-right corner of the final pair of pages, which had been bound in plastic with the bearer's details and a digital chip;  a white bar-coded form stating "Renewal" and the bearer's personal details was stuck onto the back cover.

Series B (2015–2020)
HMPO's contract with De La Rue involved the design of a new generation of biometric passport, which was released in October 2015 as the Series B passport. The cover design remained the same as Series A, with minor changes to the cover material. The number of pages of a standard passport was increased from 32 to 34, and the 50-page 'jumbo' passport replaced the previous 48-page business passport. New security features included rich three-dimensional UV imagery, cross-page printing and a single-sheet bio-data page joined with the back cover. A new typeface for the cover was adopted as well, which is now Times New Roman. At the time of its introduction, no other passport offered visa free access to more countries than the UK's Series B British passport.

The theme of the Series B passport was 'Creative United Kingdom', and HMPO described the Series B artwork as the most intricate ever featured in a British passport. Each double-spread page set featured artwork celebrating 500 years of achievements in art, architecture and innovation in the UK. Ordnance Survey maps were also printed inside featuring places related to the imagery. A portrait of William Shakespeare was embedded in each page as a watermark.

The Series B passport was initially issued to British citizens with "European Union" printed on the cover. However, new stocks of the Series B from March 2019 onwards removed the reference in anticipation of withdrawal from the EU. The premature change was controversial given the uncertainty and division in the UK during 2019.

Series C (2020–present) 

The introduction of the burgundy machine-readable passport between 1988 and 1993 had been met with significant resistance. The burgundy passports attracted criticism for their perceived flimsiness, mass-produced nature and sudden deviation from the traditional design. There was speculation regarding re-introduction of the old-style passport following the UK's withdrawal from the European Union. but the government denied any immediate plans. Such a change was supported by some due to its symbolic value, including Brexit Secretary David Davis, while others thought the undue weight put on such a trivial change raises the question of whether the government is able to prioritise its order of business ahead of Brexit. Nevertheless, the British passport was due for an update in 2020, as the existing De La Rue passport contract was expiring.

On 2 April 2017, Michael Fabricant MP said that De La Rue had stated that the coat of arms would "contrast better on navy blue than it currently does on the maroon passports" as part of their pre-tender discussions with the government. In December 2017, then Immigration Minister Brandon Lewis announced that the blue passport would "return" after exit from the EU.

Following open tender under EU public procurement rules in 2018, the Franco-Dutch security firm Gemalto was selected over British banknote and travel document printer De La Rue. The result of the tender proved highly controversial, as it saw the production of British passport blanks moved from Gateshead in the UK to Tczew, Poland. Most passports are produced in Poland, due to it being more cost efficient. However, urgent, fast-tracked or premium-service passports, which are 34 or 50 pages, are locally produced at application-processing centres in the UK.

On 10 March 2020, the new Series C blue British passport officially began to be issued. Series B passports would also be issued while the Home Office used up old stock.

On 25 September 2020, HMPO announced all British passports issued would now be blue.

Series C introduces a polycarbonate laser-engraved bio-data page with an embedded RFID chip. Also embedded in the data page is a decoding lens which optically unscrambles information hidden on the official observations page and inner front cover. The reverse of the polycarbonate data page serves as the title page and features a portrait-orientation photo of the bearer, reminiscent of pre-1988 passports. Series C features very little artwork, with a compass rose being the only printed art. The passport has the national flowers of England, Northern Ireland, Scotland and Wales (Tudor Rose, Shamrock, Scotch Thistle and Daffodil, respectively) embossed on the back cover.

National identity cards

Second World War 

The National Registration Act established a National Register which began operating on 29 September 1939 (National Registration Day). This introduced a system of identity cards, and a requirement that they must be produced on demand or presented to a police station within 48 hours. Identity cards had to be carried by every man, woman, and child at all times. They included information such as name, age, address, and occupation.

Prior to National Registration Day, 65,000 enumerators across the country delivered forms which householders were required to record their details on. On the following Sunday and Monday the enumerators visited every household, checked the form before issuing a completed identity card for each of the residents. All cards at this time were the same brown/buff colour.

Three main reasons for their introduction:

 1. The major dislocation of the population caused by mobilisation and mass evacuation and also the wartime need for complete manpower control and planning in order to maximise the efficiency of the war economy.
 2. The likelihood of rationing (introduced from January 1940 onwards).
 3. Population statistics. As the last census had been held in 1931, there was little accurate data on which to base vital planning decisions. The National Register was in fact an instant census and the National Registration Act closely resembles the 1920 Census Act in many ways

On 21 February 1952, it no longer became necessary to carry an identity card. The National Registration Act of 1939 was repealed on 22 May 1952.

Abandoned plans for "next generation" biometric passports and national identity registration
There had been plans, under the Identity Cards Act 2006, to link passports to the Identity Cards scheme. However, in the Conservative – Liberal Democrat Coalition Agreement that followed the 2010 General Election, the new government announced that they planned to scrap the ID card scheme, the National Identity Register, and the next generation of biometric passports, as part of their measures "to reverse the substantial erosion of civil liberties under the Labour Government and roll back state intrusion".

The Identity Cards Act 2006 would have required any person applying for a passport to have their details entered into a centralised computer database, the National Identity Register, part of the National Identity Scheme associated with identity cards and passports. Once registered, they would also have been obliged to update any change to their address and personal details. The identity card was expected to cost up to £60 (with £30 going to the Government, and the remainder charged as processing fees by the companies that would be collecting the fingerprints and photographs). In May 2005 the Government said that the cost for a combined identity card and passport would be £93 plus processing fees.

The next generation of biometric passports, which would have contained chips holding facial images and fingerprints, were to have been issued from 2012. Everyone applying for a passport from 2012 would have had their 10 fingerprints digitally scanned and stored on a database, although only two would have been recorded in the passport.

Nobody in the UK is required to carry any form of ID. In everyday situations, most authorities, such as the police, do not make spot checks of identification for individuals, although they may do so in instances of arrest.

Five Nations Passport Group 

Since 2004, the United Kingdom has participated in the Five Nations Passport Group, an international forum for cooperation between the passport issuing authorities in Australia, Canada, New Zealand, and the United States to "share best practices and discuss innovations related to the development of passport policies, products and practices".

Types of British passports

Owing to the many different categories in British nationality law, there are different types of passports for each class of British nationality. All categories of British passports are issued by His Majesty's Government under royal prerogative. Since all British passports are issued in the name of the Crown, the reigning monarch does not require a passport. The following table shows the number of valid British passports on the last day of 2022 and shows the different categories eligible to hold a British passport:

British citizen, British Overseas citizen, British subject, British protected person, British National (Overseas)

British citizen, British Overseas citizen, British subject, British protected person and British National (Overseas) passports are issued by HM Passport Office in the UK. British nationals of these categories applying for passports outside the UK can apply for their passport online from HMPO. British passports were previously issued by the Foreign and Commonwealth Office in British embassies around the world. However, in 2009, this was stopped and British citizen passports can now only be issued by the Passport Office in the UK. The FCO says: "In their 2006 report on consular services, the National Audit Office recommended limiting passport production to fewer locations to increase security and reduce expenditure."

Gibraltar

British citizens and British Overseas Territory citizens of Gibraltar can apply for their passport in Gibraltar, where it will be issued by the Gibraltar Civil Status and Registration Office. British citizens can still live, work, and study in Gibraltar at any time, as British citizenship grants right of abode in Gibraltar.

Crown Dependencies and Overseas Territories

British passports in Jersey, Guernsey and the Isle of Man are issued in the name of the Lieutenant-Governor of the respective Crown Dependencies on behalf of the States of Jersey, States of Guernsey and the Government of the Isle of Man respectively. Meanwhile, in British Overseas Territories, British Overseas Territories Citizen passports are issued in the name of the respective territory's governor. However, an Overseas Territory Citizen resident and renewing their passport in the UK will receive a standard (e.g. British Citizen) passport book, only with their Overseas Territory status being recorded instead.

Due to the enactment of the British Nationality (Falkland Islands) Act 1983, and the British Overseas Territories Act 2002, citizens of the Falkland Islands can only apply for British citizen passports, even though they also hold Overseas Territory Citizen status. Citizens of Gibraltar would also have their Overseas Territory passport cancelled if they applied for a British citizen passport after 2002.

The nationality reads for Overseas Territories "British Overseas Territories Citizen" regardless of the residence of the bearer. Previously, in the machine-readable zone, the three-letter ISO 3166-1 alpha-3 code of the territory is given in the field of the code of issuing state, while GBR (British Overseas Territories citizens, formerly British Dependent Territories citizens) is shown in the nationality field. Either of these features enabled automatic distinction between BOTCs related to different territories. Ever since the HMPO assumed the responsibility of the issuance of BOTC passports in 2015, however, the code of issuing state is changed to GBR for all territories, thus making it impossible to identify the holder's domicile without the aid of other features, such as the passport cover.

Special British passports

Diplomatic passports are issued in the UK by HMPO. They are issued to British diplomats and high-ranking government officials to facilitate travel abroad.

Official passports are issued to those travelling abroad on official state business.

King's Messenger passports were issued to diplomatic couriers who transport documents on behalf of HM Government. Since 2014, these have been replaced by an observation within a standard diplomatic passport.

Emergency passports are issued by British embassies across the world. Emergency passports may be issued to any person holding British nationality. Commonwealth citizens are also eligible to receive British emergency passports in countries where their country of nationality is unrepresented. Under a reciprocal agreement, British emergency passports may also be issued to EU citizens in countries where their own country does not have a diplomatic mission or is otherwise unable to assist.
Collective (also known as group) passports are issued to defined groups of 5 to 50 individuals who are British citizens under the age of 18 for travel together to the EEA and Switzerland, such as a group of school children on a school trip.

EU passports
British citizens, British Overseas Territory citizens of Gibraltar and British subjects with right of abode are considered to be UK nationals for the purpose of EU law. They were therefore considered to be EU citizens until 31 January 2020 when the UK withdrew from the EU. As a result, passports issued to these nationals were considered to be EU passports. British passports with EU status facilitated access to consular assistance from another European Union member state.

British nationals formerly holding EU status continued to enjoy free movement within the European Economic Area and Switzerland until the Brexit transition period ended on 31 December 2020. The right to live, and work in the Republic of Ireland will continue for British citizens, as British citizens are not treated as aliens under Irish law. Common Travel Area arrangements for visa-free travel remain unchanged.
Other types of British national were not considered to be EU citizens, but may nevertheless enjoy visa-free travel to the Schengen Area on a short-term basis.

Physical appearance

Outside cover
Current issue British passports are navy blue.

The blue passport sports the coat of arms of the United Kingdom emblazoned in the centre of the front cover.
"BRITISH PASSPORT" is inscribed above the coat of arms, and the name of the issuing government is inscribed below (e.g. "UNITED KINGDOM OF GREAT BRITAIN AND NORTHERN IRELAND" or "TURKS AND CAICOS ISLANDS"). Where a British national is connected to a territory that is no longer under British sovereignty (e.g. BN(O) in Hong Kong), the issuing government is the United Kingdom. The biometric passport symbol  appears at the bottom of the front cover. The rear cover of blue passports are also embossed with the floral emblems of England (Tudor rose), Northern Ireland (Shamrock), Scotland (Scottish thistle) and Wales (daffodil).

Burgundy passports issued by the UK, Gibraltar and the Crown Dependencies follow a different format, as they are based on the EU common model. The words "UNITED KINGDOM OF GREAT BRITAIN AND NORTHERN IRELAND" (+ "GIBRALTAR" where relevant) or "BRITISH ISLANDS" (+ the Dependency's name) are inscribed above the coat of arms, whilst the word "PASSPORT" is inscribed below. The biometric passport symbol  appears at the bottom of the front cover. On passports issued before 29 March 2019, the words "EUROPEAN UNION" were printed at the top of the booklet.

Function-related passports
Besides the ordinary passports described above, special passports are issued to government officials from which diplomatic status may (diplomatic passport) or may not (official passport) be conferred by the text on the cover. Until 2014 a special passport was available for a Queen's Messenger, which had on its cover the text "QUEEN’S MESSENGER – COURRIER DIPLOMATIQUE" below the coat of arms and the text "BRITISH PASSPORT" above it. Despite the red cover, the internal pages continued to resemble those of the old blue passport.

Each passport cover is detailed in the gallery below.

Inside cover
UK-issued British passports issued during the reign of Queen Elizabeth II contain on their inside cover the following words in English:

Following the accession of King Charles III, the request will read the following in English:

In older passports, more specific reference was made to "Her Britannic Majesty's Principal Secretary of State for Foreign Affairs", originally including the name of the incumbent.

In non-UK issue passports, the request is made by the Governor or Lieutenant-Governor of the territory in "the Name of Her Britannic Majesty". As with UK-issued passports, following the accession of King Charles III, the request will change to “His Britannic Majesty”.

Information page

British passports issued by HM Passport Office include the following data on the information page:

 Photograph of the owner/holder (digital image printed on page)
 Type (P)
 Code of issuing state (GBR)
 Passport number
 Surname (see note below regarding titles)
 Given names
 Nationality (the class of British nationality, such as "British Citizen" or "British Overseas Citizen", or if issued on behalf of a Commonwealth country, "Commonwealth Citizen")
 Date of birth
 Sex (Gender)
 Place of birth (only the city or town is listed, even if born outside the UK; places of birth in Wales are entered in Welsh upon request )
 Date of issue
 Authority
 Date of expiry
 Machine-readable zone starting with P< GBR

The items are identified by text in English and French (e.g., "Given names/Prénoms"). Translations into Welsh, Scottish Gaelic, Irish and Spanish are written on page 5 (Series C), with the English and French translation also being included (e.g, "Surname / Cyfenw / Cinneadh / Sloinne / Nom / Apellidos"). Passports issued until March 2019 were translated into all official EU languages.

According to the British government, the current policy of using noble titles on passports requires that the applicant provides evidence that the Lord Lyon has recognised a feudal barony, or the title is included in Burke's Peerage. If accepted (and if the applicant wishes to include the title), the correct form is for the applicant to include the territorial designation as part of their surname (Surname of territorial designation e.g. Smith of Inverglen). The official observation would then show the holder's full name, followed by their feudal title e.g. The holder is John Smith, Baron of Inverglen.

Official Observations page

Certain British passports are issued with printed endorsements on the Official Observations page, usually in upper case (capital letters). They form part of the passport when it is issued, as distinct from immigration stamps subsequently entered in the visa pages. Some examples are:

 The Holder has right of abode in the United Kingdom

British Subjects with the right of abode (usually from Ireland) have this endorsement in their passports. Between 1973 and 1982, this observation was also in passports issued to British Subjects with a connection to the UK (now British Citizens).

 The Holder is entitled to readmission in the United Kingdom

British Overseas Citizens who have been granted indefinite leave to enter or remain after 1968 retain this entitlement for life as their ILR is not subject to the two-year expiration rule, and their passports are accordingly issued with this endorsement.

 The Holder is subject to control under the Immigration Act 1971

British nationals without the right of abode in the UK will have this endorsement in their passports unless they have been granted indefinite leave to enter or remain. However, even though a BN(O) passport does not entitle the holder the right of abode in the UK, this endorsement is not found in BN(O) passports (1999 and biometric versions).

 The Holder is not entitled to benefit from European Union provisions relating to employment or establishment

British citizens from Jersey, Guernsey and the Isle of Man without a qualifying connection to the United Kingdom by descent or residency for more than five years previously had this endorsement in their passports. Moreover, British Overseas Citizens and British Nationals (Overseas) would have the same endorsement if they renewed their BOC/BN(O) passport after 29 March 2019. This observation ceased to be used from 1 January 2021.

 In accordance with the United Kingdom immigration rules the holder of this passport does not require an entry certificate or visa to visit the United Kingdom

This endorsement is found in BN(O) passports, and accordingly holders of BN(O) passports are allowed to enter the UK as a visitor without an entry certificate or visa for up to six months per entry.

 The Holder is also a British National (Overseas)

British citizens who also possess BN(O) status may have this endorsement in their passports to signify their additional status, with the holder’s consent.

 The Holder (of this passport has Hong Kong permanent identity card no XXXXXXXX which states that the holder) has the right of abode in Hong Kong

British Nationals (Overseas) (BN(O)s) have this endorsement in their passports, as registration as a BN(O) before 1997 required the applicant to hold a valid Hong Kong permanent identity card, which guaranteed the holder's right of abode in Hong Kong.
Such persons would continue to have right of abode or right to land in Hong Kong after the transfer of sovereignty of Hong Kong in 1997 under the Immigration Ordinance. This endorsement is also found in a British citizen passport when the holder has both British citizenship and BN(O) status (at the holder’s request).
Before the Hong Kong Act 1985 and Hong Kong (British Nationality) Order 1986 were enacted, nationals of Hong Kong were entitled to British Dependent Territory Citizen status (British Subject CUKC before 1983). The observation then merely read:
 The Holder has right of abode in Hong Kong.

 The Holder is or The Holder is also known as ...

This endorsement is found in passports where the holder uses or retains another professional, stage or religious name and is known by it "for all purposes", or has a recognised form of address, academic, feudal or legal title (e.g. Doctor, European Engineer, Queen's Counsel, Professor, Minister of Religion) regarded as important identifiers of an individual. The styling 'Dr ...', 'Professor ...' or similar is recorded here, or the alternative professional/stage/religious name, usually on request by the passport holder. For example, Cliff Richard's birth name was Harry Webb, and the passport Observations page would read:

"The Holder is also known as Cliff Richard"

This endorsement is also found in the passport of persons with Peerage titles, members of the Privy Council, holders of knighthoods and other decorations, etc, to declare the holder's title.

Also, this endorsement is found if the passport holder's name is too long to fit within the 30-character limits (including spaces) on the passport information page; applies to each line reserved for the surname and the first given name including any middle name(s). In this scenario the holder's full name will be written out in full on the Observations page. According to the British passport agency guidelines, a person with a long or multiple given name, which cannot fit within the 30-character passport information page limits, should enter as much of the first given name, followed by the initials of all middle names (if any). The same advice applies to a long or multiple surname. The holder's full name is then shown printed out in its entirety on the passport Observations page. For example, Kiefer Sutherland's birth name would read on the passport information page:

Surname: "Sutherland"
Given names: "Kiefer W F D G R"
Observations page:
"The Holder is Kiefer William Frederick Dempsey George Rufus Sutherland"

 The holder's name in Chinese Commercial Code: XXXX XXXX XXXX
This endorsement was found in BN(O) and Hong Kong British Dependent Territories Citizen passports held by BN(O)s and British Dependent Territories Citizens with a connection to Hong Kong who have a Chinese name recognised by the Hong Kong Immigration Department before the handover. After the handover, British passports issued in Hong Kong can only be issued at the British Consulate-General, and this endorsement is no longer in use. (See also: Chinese commercial code)

 Holder is a member of His Britannic Majesty's Diplomatic Service
 Holder is a spouse/dependant of a member of His Britannic Majesty's Diplomatic Service

This endorsement is found in British passports held by people who are dependants or spouses of British diplomats.

Multiple passports
People who have valid reasons may be allowed to hold more than one passport booklet. This applies usually to people who travel frequently on business, and may need to have a passport booklet to travel on while the other is awaiting a visa for another country. Some Muslim-majority countries including Syria, Lebanon, Libya, Kuwait, Iran, Iraq, Pakistan, Saudi Arabia, Sudan, and Yemen do not issue visas to visitors if their passports bear a stamp or visa issued by Israel, as a result of the Israeli–Palestinian conflict. In that case, a person can apply for a second passport to avoid travel issues. Reasons and supporting documentation (such as a letter from an employer) must be provided.

In addition, a person who has dual British citizenship and British Overseas Territories citizenship is allowed to hold two British passports under different statuses at the same time. Persons who acquired their BOTC status with a connection to Gibraltar or Falkland Islands, however, are not eligible due to differences in regulations, and their BOTC passports will be cancelled when their British citizen passports are issued even when they possess both citizenships.

Monarch
The King, Charles III, is not required to hold a passport because passports are issued in his name and on his authority, thus making it superfluous for him to hold one. All other members of the royal family, however, including the heir apparent William, Prince of Wales, do require passports.

Visa requirements

Visa requirements for British citizens are administrative entry restrictions by the authorities of other states placed on citizens of the United Kingdom. As of March 2023, holders of regular British Citizen passports had visa-free or visa on arrival access to 188 countries and territories, ranking the British Citizen passport 6th in the world in terms of travel freedom (tied with the French, Irish, and Portuguese passports) according to the Henley Passport Index.  Additionally, Arton Capital's Passport Index ranked the British Citizen passport 5th in the world in terms of travel freedom, with a visa-free score of 169 (tied with the Singaporean, Maltese, Lithuanian, and Slovak passports), as of 28 September 2022.

Visa requirements for other categories of British nationals, namely British Nationals (Overseas), British Overseas Citizens, British Overseas Territories Citizens, British Protected Persons, and British Subjects, are different.

Statistics

Passport statistics

Foreign travel statistics

According to the Foreign travel advice provided by the British Government (unless otherwise noted) these are the numbers of British visitors to various countries per annum in 2015 (unless otherwise noted):

Cost
The cost of a British passport is between free and £104, for an adult (16 and over) 50-page frequent traveler passport who apply by paper form.

Pre-Brexit, the contract for printing British passports had been held by British company De La Rue.  In 2018, the contract for printing post-Brexit was awarded to Franco-Dutch company Gemalto, which in 2019 became Thales DIS, part of the multinational Thales Group. The passports booklets will be printed more cheaply in Poland, with a controversial loss of printer jobs at De La Rue, but the passports will be personalised in the UK across two sites.

Gallery of British passports

See also
Visa requirements for British citizens
Five Nations Passport Group
Former passports of the European Union
Passports in Europe

Notes

References

External links

British passports
United Kingdom